Amycus is a genus of jumping spiders that was first described by Carl Ludwig Koch in 1846.

Species
 it contains twelve species, found only in South America and Mexico:
Amycus albipalpus Galvis, 2015 – Colombia
Amycus amrishi Makhan, 2006 – Suriname
Amycus annulatus Simon, 1900 – Brazil
Amycus ectypus Simon, 1900 – Peru, Brazil
Amycus equulus Simon, 1900 – Brazil
Amycus flavicomis Simon, 1900 – Brazil, Argentina
Amycus flavolineatus C. L. Koch, 1846 – Mexico
Amycus igneus (Perty, 1833) (type) – Brazil
Amycus lycosiformis Taczanowski, 1878 – Peru
Amycus pertyi Simon, 1900 – Peru, French Guiana
Amycus rufifrons Simon, 1900 – Brazil
Amycus spectabilis C. L. Koch, 1846 – Colombia, Peru, Brazil

References

Salticidae
Salticidae genera
Spiders of Mexico
Spiders of South America
Taxa named by Carl Ludwig Koch